Boumi-Louetsi is a department of Ngounié Province in southern Gabon. The capital lies at Mbigou. It had a population of 13,223 in 2013.

Towns and villages
Mbigou
Lingoye

References

Ngounié Province
Departments of Gabon